Great Broughton refers to two villages in England:

 Great Broughton, Cumbria
 Great Broughton, North Yorkshire

See also
 Great Boughton, Cheshire, England